Girl Talk is a board game first sold in 1988.  The game was invented by Catherine Rondeau. It was a popular/staple game for teenage girls throughout the 1990s. It was similar to the parlour game Truth or Dare. Girl Talk was one of a rash of "teenage girl-themed games" that appeared on the market in the 1980s and 1990s in which boys, talking on the phone, dancing, having parties and sleepovers, and other "girl-ish" concerns are central themes.

Gameplay
The game comes with an opaque spinner with a hole in it, and multiple exchangeable cardboard circles which can be placed into the spinner. The spinner would land on either a question or a "dare". Each action (or question) is worth a certain number of points. If a player does not perform the action or answer a question they must wear a "zit sticker" for the rest of the game. Players may use their points to buy one of four kinds of fortune cards; the first to collect one of all four types is the winner.

Variants
Girl Talk: A Game of Truth or Dare (original)
Girl Talk: Secret Diary
Girl Talk: Date Line
Girl Talk: The CD-ROM Game
That's So Raven Girl Talk (2000s, not part of the original set)
Hannah Montana Girl Talk (2000s, not part of the original set)
Jenga Girl Talk (2000s, not part of the original set) (this had both a pink and an 'Ultimate' red edition)
Girl Talk: "One Direction edition"
Encore
Dweebs, Geeks, and Weirdos
Justin Bieber game
Sex and the City game
Are You Afraid of the Dark
Backseat Drawing
The Collage Game
Tales of the Crystals
Alex Mack game
Read My Lips game
Lovies infant plush
Puddleduds children's wear
Izone camera
Hidden Talents game
A&E Biography game
Yearbook game
Dream Builders construction toys
Note: This list is not complete.

References

External links
 

Board games introduced in 1988
Party board games